The Locksmith is a six-part British television drama series, created and written by Stephen Bill, that first broadcast on BBC1 on 25 September 1997. The series, which stars Warren Clarke and Chris Gascoyne, follows Roland Pierce (Clarke), a locksmith-turned-vigilante who tries to track down the man responsible for a brutal attack on his estranged wife, Carla (writer Stephen Bill's wife, Sheila Kelley), which leaves her with brain damage. The police suspect a local junkie, Paul (John Simm) is responsible, but Roland remains unconvinced and sets out on his own quest to discover the truth.

The series was broadcast at 9:30 pm on Thursdays, and notably broadcast concurrently alongside another series featuring Simm, The Lakes. The series was released on DVD via Simply Media on 19 October 2015.

Reception
Mark Cunliffe for Letterboxd reviewed the series upon its release on DVD, writing; "The cast for The Locksmith is brilliant; Clarke, Kelley and Polly Hemingway perform the central triangle of husband, estranged wife and current, long suffering lover, whilst a younger generation of actors including Chris Gascoyne, Sarah-Jane Potts and John Simm are equally capable in the other roles."

He added; "Watching it back, I'm wondering if The Locksmith was actually intended to be a recurring series as opposed to a one-shot series or mini-series. There was certainly more mileage for a second run of six further episodes, but whether it was ever the intention to or not, it was just not to be."

Cast
 Warren Clarke as Roland Pierce 
 Chris Gascoyne as Barry Forrester 
 Sheila Kelley as Carla Pierce
 Sarah-Jane Potts as Alice Pierce 
 Polly Hemingway as Lesley Bygrave 
 Kenneth Hadley as Det. Sgt. Crossman 
 James Vaughan	as Nigel Cadwallader 
 Paul Reynolds as Dixie 
 John Simm as Paul 
 Julian Kerridge as Ian 
 Nirjay Mahindru as PC Tandon 
 Rebecca Raybone as WPC Fields 
 Stella Moray as Hilda 
 James Warrior	as Peter

Episodes

References

External links

1997 British television series debuts
1997 British television series endings
1990s British crime drama television series
1990s British television miniseries
English-language television shows
BBC television dramas
Murder in television
Television shows set in London
Television shows set in Warwickshire